Sensor Coating Systems is an instrumentation company that develops temperature-sensing technologies. It was formerly part of Southside Thermal Sciences.

In early 2018, Sensor Coating Systems started a project with NASA and other aerospace industry companies. This project, called CAUTION, aimed to increase the temperature range of a material called thermal history coating. This advancement could enable the development of more efficient jet engines.

History
Sensor Coating Systems is located in London. It was spun out of Southside Thermal Sciences in 2012, as it became apparent that Southside Thermal Sciences' future product development focus should be on a smart offline temperature-sensing technology.

Technologies
Sensor Coating Systems has developed two offline temperature measurements: thermal history coatings and thermal history paint. These technologies utilize the luminescent properties of materials to provide information on past temperatures that they experienced. These patented technologies allow for the readout of past temperatures from a continuous surface, enabling the thermal analysis of components, which have been operated in extreme conditions, such as jet engines and industrial gas turbines. 
The table below shows the differences between the Thermal History Coating and the Thermal History Paint:

A thermal history coating is a robust coating containing various non-toxic chemical compounds whose crystal structures irreversibly change at high temperatures. This allows for temperature measurements and thermal analysis to be performed on intricate and inaccessible components, which these rate in harsh environments. Thermal history coating provides protection from intense heat to the surfaces on which they are applied. The thermal history paint is more durable than the thermal history coating. The thermal history paint can be applied with an air spray gun.

References

British companies established in 2012
Companies based in the London Borough of Barking and Dagenham
Luminescence